Archibald Bostwick Morrison Jr. (June 4, 1878 – June 15, 1967) was an American football and basketball player and coach of football and baseball.  He served as the head football coach at Virginia Agricultural and Mechanical College and Polytechnic Institute (VPI)—now known as Virginia Tech—for one season in 1901, compiling a record of 6–1.

Playing career
Before coaching, Morrison played halfback as an undergraduate at Cornell University for three seasons and also captained the basketball team in his senior year.

Coaching career

VPI
The 1901 season was the most successful season for the program up to that time, and would continue to hold that mark until 1909 under head coach Branch Bocock, who tied that mark that year and later would improve the season win/loss percentage in the 1913 season.  The season included victories over Clemson and Georgetown.  The team's only defeat came from Virginia on October 26, 1901, by a score of 0-16.  This was the only game of the season that the Hokies did not score.

Assistant coaching
After coaching at VPI for one year, he returned to Cornell as an assistant coach in 1902.

Late life
Morrison enter a career in municipal bonds in 1915.  In 1931, he moved from Detroit, Michigan to Coral Gables, Florida, where he opened A. B. Morrison & Co.  Morrison died on June 15, 1967.

Head coaching record

Football

References

External links
 

1878 births
1967 deaths
19th-century players of American football
American football halfbacks
Cornell Big Red football coaches
Cornell Big Red football players
Cornell Big Red men's basketball players
Hobart Statesmen football players
Virginia Tech Hokies baseball coaches
Virginia Tech Hokies football coaches
People from Geneva, New York
American men's basketball players